This was the first edition of the tournament.

Nina Stojanović won the title, defeating Aleksandrina Naydenova in the final, 6–1, 6–1.

Seeds

Draw

Finals

Top half

Bottom half

References

Main Draw

Changsha Open - Singles